Werner Brandt (born January 3, 1954 in Herne) is a German manager.

Education 
Brandt studied business administration at the University of Erlangen-Nuremberg from 1976 to 1981, and received his doctorate from the TU Darmstadt in 1991.

Career 
He started his professional career at PriceWaterhouse in Stuttgart, where he was employed from 1981 to 1992. He then served as a member of the executive board of Baxter Deutschland GmbH for seven years before becoming CFO and labor director of Fresenius Medical Care AG, where he served for two years. From February 2001 to 30 June 2014, he was CFO of SAP AG. In September 2009, he succeeded his former SAP board colleague, Claus E. Heinrich, as a member of the board of the association “Zukunft Metropolregion Rhein-Neckar”(Future Metropolregion Rhein-Neckar) (ZMRN e.V.).

Brandt is a member of the supervisory boards of Deutsche Lufthansa AG and Qiagen N.V. On 27 February 2013, RWE AG announced that the supervisory board decideded to propose Brandt for election to the supervisory board at the upcoming annual general meeting. Since 26 June 2014, he has been Chairman of the supervisory board of ProSiebenSat.1 Media AG and, since the conversion in 2016, ProSiebenSat.1 Media SE.

Brandt was also a member and chairman of the supervisory board of innogy SE, but resigned due to personal reasons effective as of 31 December 2017.

On 18 November 2014, a press release from the IFRS Foundation announced that it would be acting as a member of the advisory board, beginning January 1, 2015.

Industrial positions 
At a conference on the future of employee ownership, which took place in Frankfurt am Main in November 2013, Brandt criticized, that the existing tax allowances in Germany, with only 360 Euro, are too low in international comparison. He pleaded for the British model with allowances that would equal around 3,500 Euro.

Brandt predicted that without a change in the tax environment in Germany the size of employee ownership would not increase, which is currently less than 1% for many companies.

Further affiliations 
He is member of the board of the association "Zukunft Metropolregion Rhein-Neckar".

References 

1954 births
Living people
People from Herne, North Rhine-Westphalia
Businesspeople from North Rhine-Westphalia
SAP SE people
Technische Universität Darmstadt alumni
Academic staff of Technische Universität Darmstadt
ProSiebenSat.1 Media
Fellows of the American Physical Society